Andrey Vladimirovich Parakhodin (born 29 July 1990) is a Russian badminton player. He was born in Kaluga, and now live in Nizhny Novgorod. Parakhodin was the runner-up at the 2016 National Championships in the mixed doubles event, and also became the men's doubles semifinalist in 2017.

He educated at the Moscow State Forest University, and competed at the 2013 Summer Universiade in Kazan, Russia.

Achievements

BWF International Challenge/Series 
Men's doubles

Mixed doubles

  BWF International Challenge tournament
  BWF International Series tournament
  BWF Future Series tournament

References

External links 
 

1990 births
Living people
Sportspeople from Kaluga
Russian male badminton players
Moscow State Forest University alumni